Kawasaki Jet Ski is a video game for the Wii console, released in 2008. It was created by Data Design Interactive, a budget developer.

Reception
Kawasaki Jet Ski has generally received negative reviews, as well as negative ratings. It received a 2.0/10 at IGN, and a 3/10 at GamesRadar. It has been criticized for poor graphics and unresponsive controls.

References

2008 video games
Data Design Interactive games
Kawasaki Heavy Industries
Personal watercraft racing video games
Video games developed in the United Kingdom
Wii-only games
Wii games